The Detroit Diesel Series 110, with  displacement per cylinder, was introduced in 1945 as more-powerful alternative to the existing Series 71 engines. It was used in a variety of applications, including construction equipment, marine propulsion and power generation. The most popular use was in the Budd RDC self-powered rail car. It was also heavily used in Euclid construction machinery. In 1951 a marine version was also introduced.

Overview 

The Detroit Diesel Series 110 is a two-stroke cycle Diesel engine series, available in straight-6 cylinder configuration (in keeping with the standard Detroit Diesel practice at the time, engines were referred to using a concatenation of the number of cylinders and the displacement, so this was a model 6-110). It was introduced as the second mass-market product of the Detroit Diesel Engine Division of General Motors in 1945.

The 6-110 series engines utilize uniflow scavenging, where a blower mounted to the exterior of the engine provides intake air through cored passages in the engine block and ports in the cylinder walls at slightly greater than atmospheric pressure. The engine exhausts through push-rod operated poppet valves in the cylinder head, with either two or four valves per cylinder. Unit fuel injection is employed, one injector per cylinder, with no high fuel pressure outside of the injector body. The injectors are cycled from the same camshaft responsible for opening the exhaust valves.

As a two stroke cycle Diesel engine cannot naturally aspirate, or draw in its own intake air, the blower is necessary to provide air in an amount sufficient both for scavenging of exhaust gasses from the cylinder and to support combustion. Initial versions of the 6-110 engine used a centrifugal-type supercharger. This was very practical for fixed-speed applications such as marine or generator service, but proved a failure in automotive applications. "The engine was developed on the dyno and was never operated above rated RPM. The first application was in Euclid mining trucks, where the driver's income depends on how fast he drives the empty truck back down into the pit. The centrifugal blower ran about 10 times engine speed. Exceeding that RPM was fatal, and in a truck a single missed downshift could mean a failed engine." For that reason a Roots type blower was made available as an option after about 1952. Later high performance versions were available with turbochargers.

The initial Series 71 engines from Detroit Diesel were produced in 1-, 2-, 3-, 4- and 6-cylinder versions. The most powerful version, the 6-71, displaced  and produced  at 1800 rpm. While these engines with their low cost and relatively light weight were highly successful, there was also great demand for higher horsepower, especially for non-highway applications such as power generation and construction equipment.

Since inline engines of more than 6 cylinders tend to have substantial technical problems, and since GM was not to perfect V-block engine technology for another decade, they took two divergent approaches to achieving higher horsepower. One was to couple together multiple 6-71 engines in twin (side-by-side), tandem (fore-and-aft) and the quad (four 6-71s all driving a single shaft). While these did produce high horsepower and even added some redundancy, they were mechanically complex and relatively expensive.

The alternative approach was to design a new engine and increase the displacement from the existing , or roughly a 50% increase. While the basic engine components (block, crankshaft, pistons, etc.) were all new, many of the additional components (injectors, governors, accessories, marine gears) were simply shared with the Series 71 engines. Since the 6-110 was designed from the outset for heavy-duty high-horsepower applications, it was never produced in a four-cylinder version (that would have displaced , very close to the  displaced by the 6-71).

The introduction of the V-71 series in 1957 effectively doomed the 6-110, as both the 8-71 ( displacement) and 12-71 ( displacement) offered higher horsepower in a more compact form factor. However the high torque and great reliability of the 6-110 was still valued for heavy-duty applications.

The Series 110 was last produced in 1965, after which the manufacturing rights were purchased by the W. W. Williams Distribution Company, which continues to provide parts for these engines.

Specifications 

The 6-110 was a remarkably flexible engine. The same basic block was available in both clockwise and counterclockwise rotation, and the exhaust manifold was also available on either the left or right side.

All 6-110 engines were designated a Unit Model Number 62200, with 62200 RA designating starboard rotation and 62200 LA designating port rotation.

Other specifications include:

Advertising 
Quoting from an introductory ad (Yachting Magazine, January 1951):

"Here's the newest member of the General Motors Diesel family - the brawny 6-110 engine that develops .

Quoting from an introductory article (Motor Boating Magazine, August 1950):

"A new compact, light weight Diesel engine, now being manufactured by Detroit Diesel Engine Division of General Motors, promises the economy and efficiency of Diesel power in scores of applications where such power could not be used before because of size and weight. The engine has undergone extensive testing in U. S. Coast Guard vessels.

The new 110 engine embodies the same advanced principles of high-speed, two-cycle design as the 71 series, of which more than 45,000,000 horsepower have been produced by Detroit Diesel since 1937. Features include blower scavenging with a new and highly efficient gear-driven centrifugal blower furnishing considerably more air for the cylinders than is needed for combustion. GM unit injectors (one for each cylinder) pump, meter and atomize the fuel, and are easily removed for inspection or exchange. Cylinder block and head are one-piece castings, both being symmetrical about a vertical plane between the No. 3 and 4 cylinders. This symmetry allows the cylinder head and block to be reversed, giving a choice of rotational directions and making possible a variety of accessory locations to suit installation requirements.

The engine is of rugged heavy-duty construction throughout. All wearing parts such as cylinder liners, bearings, valve guides and inserts are precision parts and are readily replaceable, which adds to engine life and ease of repair. Large main bearing and crankpin journals assure long bearing life."

References

110
Two-stroke diesel engines
Straight-six engines
Diesel engines by model